Mark Peploe (born 3 March 1943) is an English screenwriter and film director. He was the brother of Clare Peploe, and the brother-in-law of director Bernardo Bertolucci.

Works

As screenwriter
The Pied Piper (1972)
The Passenger (1975)
The Last Emperor (1987)
The Sheltering Sky (1990)
Little Buddha (1994)

As director
Samson and Delilah (1984 short film)
Afraid of the Dark (1991)
Victory (1996)

Awards
For The Last Emperor
Academy Award for Best Adapted Screenplay, (1988)
45th Golden Globe Awards, Best Screenplay (1987)
David di Donatello for Best Script (1988)

References

External links

1943 births
Best Adapted Screenplay Academy Award winners
Best Screenplay Golden Globe winners
Living people